The Odenton Town Center is a  area of Odenton, Anne Arundel County, Maryland, United States, designated in official plans for mixed-use development.

The Odenton Town Center has been planned as a Town Center since 1968. In 1990, legislation created an Odenton Growth Management Area (OGMA) to encourage development in the Town Center Area. In 1995, the Odenton Town Plan was adopted. In 2004, the updated Odenton Town Center Master Plan was adopted.

In July 2010 a Developer's Rights and Responsibilities Agreement (DRRA) was signed between The Halle Companies and Anne Arundel County which will allow the company to complete the stretch of Town Center Boulevard that connects the Seven Oaks Community with the Odenton MARC Station.  In return, the County will be given the right to connect new water and sewer systems through the 128-acre parcel owned by The Halles.  It has been reported that this is the final piece needed to allow the Odenton Town Center to move forward.

Location overview
Odenton Town Center is the name given to the entire Odenton Growth Management Area. The OTC is a sixteen hundred and  area, located in the western part of Anne Arundel County, Maryland.  The plan is clearly centered on the Odenton MARC station, which draws overflow crowds of 2,100 riders for 1,300 parking spaces daily.

External links
 County government planning
 https://web.archive.org/web/20081120180327/http://www.odentontowncenter.com/
 http://www.odentontowncenter.net

References

Odenton, Maryland
Unincorporated communities in Maryland